Vivianne Crowley is an author, university lecturer, psychologist, and a High Priestess and teacher of the Wiccan religion. She was initiated into the London coven of Alex Sanders (founder of the Alexandrian tradition of Wicca) at the age of eighteen, but later joined a Gardnerian coven in the famous Whitecroft line derived from Eleanor Bone, and so she was one of few people in the seventies to be part of both traditions.

She founded the Wicca Study Group in London in 1988, and became secretary of the Pagan Federation the same year. Vivianne Crowley was described as "very influential in recent developments in Wicca...  She has more of less captained the bringing together of the Gardnerian and Alexandrian Traditions through the process of cross-initiation, where a person is initiated into both Traditions". Professor Ronald Hutton also has described Vivianne as "the closest thing that Britain possessed to an informal successor to Alex Sanders.

As an interfaith coordinator for the Federation, she served as the U.K. coordinator of the Pagan Chaplainry Services for H.M. Prisons. In 1989, she released her first book Wicca: The Old Religion in the New Age, which is one of the most valued and widespread books on Wicca. It was revised and updated in 1996 as Wicca: The Old Religion in the New Millennium.

Crowley is a Jungian psychologist who lectures on the psychology of religion at King's College London, University of London. She holds a bachelor's degree and Ph.D. in Psychology from the University of London.  She is also the adjunct professor at the Union Institute in Cincinnati, Ohio.

Bibliography

Books
 Phoenix from the Flame: Pagan Spirituality in the Western World (1994) Thorsons Publishers (Reissue edition) ,  
 Principles of Paganism (1996) Thorsons Publishers (Reissue edition) , 
 Principles of Wicca (1998) Thorsons , 
 Principles of Jungian Spirituality: The Only Instruction You'll Ever Need (1998) Thorsons , 
 Celtic Wisdom: Seasonal Festivals and Rituals (1998) Sterling Pub Co Inc , 
 Your dark side : How to turn your inner negativity into positive energy (2001) (co-author Christopher Crowley)  Thorsons 
 The Goddess Book of Days (2003) Vega Books  ,  
 Wild Once : Awaken the magic within. Unleash true Power (2022) Penguin

Journal articles
 "Wicca as Nature Religion" in Nature Religion Today: Paganism in the Modern World J.Pearson, Professor R.Roberts, G.Samuel (1998), pp. 170–179. 
 "Jungian Feminists" in Leeming D. (eds) Encyclopedia of Psychology and Religion. Springer, Berlin, Heidelberg. https://doi.org/10.1007/978-3-642-27771-9_200080-1
 "Carl Jung and the Development of Contemporary Paganism" paper for `The Development of Paganism: History, Influences and Contexts, 1880-2002' Conference organised by The Open University Religious Studies Research Group Belief Beyond Boundaries (12 January 2002).

References

External links
 Consultants profile of Dr Vivianne Crowley at site The College of Psychic studies
 Vogue magazine article (Arts & lifetstyle). `How To Celebrate The Spring Equinox, According To A Wiccan High Priestess' (16th March 2022) by Vivianne Crowley
 Illustrated livestream talk on `Carl Jung and The Red Book: A Voyage into Imagination and Spirit' by Dr Vivianne Crowley
 Treadwells London bookshop event `An on the sofa talk'  Vivianne Crowley interviewed in person & livestream by Dr Christina Oakley Harrington (13th March 2022)
 FemaleFirst site feature on books coming up by Holly Mosley (8th March 2022)
 Academia.edu site profile

Alexandrian Wicca
Alumni of the University of London
English occult writers
English Wiccans
Wiccan priestesses
Academics of King's College London
Living people
Year of birth missing (living people)
Wiccan writers